The Roman Catholic Diocese of Timmins (erected 21 September 1908, as the Vicariate Apostolic of Temiskaming) is a suffragan of the Archdiocese of Ottawa. It was elevated as the Diocese of Haileybury on 31 December 1915 and renamed as the Diocese of Timmins on 10 December 1938.

History 
The Vicariate Apostolic of Temiskaming was set up bounded on the north by Hudson Bay and the Great Whale River; on the south by the height of land, or watershed, except in the Temiskaming district, where the southern boundary is 47° N. lat.; on the east by 72° W. long and on the west by 91° W long. It was erected on 22 Sept., 1908, by dividing the Diocese of Pembroke. 

Father de Bellefeuille, S.S., and Father Dupuy of Montreal, first preached the Gospel here in 1836. Annual visits were made, missions being held at the Hudson's Bay Company's trading posts. The Oblates of Mary Immaculate were given charge in 1843. Father Laverlochere was the first of these missionaries. They established a residence at Fort Temiskaming in 1863, but removed to Ville Marie in 1886. 

Haileybury, Ontario was the residence of the first vicar Apostolic, Elie-Anicet Latulipe. He was born at St. Anicet, Province of Quebec, 3 August 1859. Ordained on 30 May 1885, he was successively curate at St. Henri, Montreal, chaplain at the convents of the Good Shepherd, Montreal, and St. Anne's, Lachine, rector of Pembroke Cathedral, and pastor of Haileybury. He was named Titular Bishop of Catenna and first Vicar-Apostolic of Temiskaming on 1 October 1908, and consecrated on 30 November 1908.

Bishops

Ordinaries
Élie Anicet Latulipe (1908–1922)
Louis Rhéaume, O.M.I. (1923–1955)
Maxime Tessier (1955–1971)
Jacques Landriault (1971–1990)
Gilles Cazabon, O.M.I. (1992–1997), appointed  Bishop of Saint-Jérôme, Québec
Paul Marchand, S.M.M. (1999 - 2011)
Serge Poitras-Patrick (2012.11.10 – ...) (°1949.05.27)

Coadjutor bishop
Maxime Tessier (1953–1955)

Other priest of this diocese who became bishop
 Paul-André Durocher, archbishop of Gatineau

Territorial losses

Notes

Bibliography

External links 
 Diocese of Timmins - official site
 GCatholic - diocese of Timmins 
 Catholic Encyclopaedia - The Vicariate Apostolic of Temiskaming

Timmins
Christian organizations established in 1908
Roman Catholic dioceses and prelatures established in the 20th century
1908 establishments in Ontario